Caio Aparecido Da Silveira Torres (born 3 June 1987) is a Brazilian professional basketball player.

Professional career
Torres declared himself eligible for the 2005 NBA Draft and 2007 NBA Draft, but withdrew prior to both.

Torres has played with São José Basketball and several other clubs in the Brazilian League.

National team career
A member of the senior men's Brazilian national basketball team, Torres played with the squad at the 2006 FIBA World Championship, where Brazil finished in 19th place. He also played at the 2012 Summer Olympics.

References

External links
FIBA Profile
LatinBasket.com Profile
Spanish League Profile 

1987 births
Living people
2006 FIBA World Championship players
Basketball players at the 2007 Pan American Games
Basketball players at the 2012 Summer Olympics
Brazilian expatriate basketball people in Spain
Brazilian men's basketball players
CB Estudiantes players
CB Guadalajara players
Centers (basketball)
Ciclista Olímpico players
Club Athletico Paulistano basketball players
CR Vasco da Gama basketball players
Esporte Clube Pinheiros basketball players
Flamengo basketball players
Liga ACB players
Melilla Baloncesto players
Menorca Bàsquet players
Mogi das Cruzes Basquete players
Novo Basquete Brasil players
Olympic basketball players of Brazil
Pan American Games gold medalists for Brazil
Pan American Games medalists in basketball
São José Basketball players
Basketball players from São Paulo
Medalists at the 2007 Pan American Games